Beasley Park is a park in the Lower City of Hamilton, Ontario, Canada and named after Richard Beasley, (1761–1842), a soldier, political figure, farmer and businessman in Upper Canada. Richard Beasley was one of Hamilton's first settlers who came to Canada from New York in 1777. Beasley Park is bounded by Cannon Street (north), Mary Street (west), Wilson Street (south) and Ferguson Avenue (east).

History
Beasley Park was originally developed in 1976. Prior to this, Beasley Park was the site of some of Hamilton's early industries, including the Grand Trunk Railway yards. In 1991, the re-development of the park was deemed a priority for revitalization of the Beasley neighbourhood. Improvements included the installation of an accessible creative play structure, a decorative fountain, concrete walkway, a community centre and a skateboarding area. Funding was provided by the Province of Ontario through the programme for Renewal, Improvement, Development, Economic revitalization and Housing Intensification (P.R.I.D.E. H.I.N.T.) and the City of Hamilton.

References

MapArt Golden Horseshoe Atlas - Page 647 - Grids G12

Parks in Hamilton, Ontario